Kingtown may refer to the following places in the United States:

Kingtown, Arkansas, unincorporated community in Phillips County
Kingtown, New Jersey, unincorporated community in Hunterdon County

See also
Kingston (disambiguation)
Kingstone (disambiguation)
Kington (disambiguation)
Kingstown (disambiguation)
Kinston (disambiguation)